Trdkova is a village in the Municipality of Kuzma in the Prekmurje region of Slovenia.  It lies right on the border between Slovenia, Austria, and Hungary.

There is a small chapel-shrine with a belfry in the village. It is dedicated to Saints Cyril and Methodius.

References

External links
 Trdkova on Geopedia

Populated places in the Municipality of Kuzma